Ángel Pérez García (16 October 1957 – 16 October 2019) was a Spanish football defender and manager.

Playing career
Born in Madrid, García joined Real Madrid's youth setup in 1973 at the age of 16, after impressing in a trial. He played his first professional match on 3 September 1978, appearing with the reserves in a 1–2 away loss against AD Almería in the Segunda División.

García was promoted to the first team in April 1980, and made his La Liga debut on the 5th by replacing injured Goyo Benito in a 1–0 home victory over Sporting de Gijón. After appearing in only ten league matches during the following campaign, he was loaned to second level club Real Murcia.

García subsequently returned to Real Madrid in the summer of 1982, and was sold to Elche CF also of the second division. After achieving promotion in his second season, he returned to Murcia in 1985, going on to alternate between the top flight and the second tier during his spell.

García left the Estadio de La Condomina in 1991, and joined lower league side CD Roldán. He retired in 1992, aged 34.

Coaching career
In 2004, García was appointed youth coordinator at UD Almería, becoming manager of the reserves the following season. After two years as an instructor of Real Madrid's coaches in Central America, he joined Sangonera Atlético CF as head coach in June 2009.

On 3 December 2009, García was named CF Atlético Ciudad manager. He was sacked in February.

On 12 February 2011, García was appointed at Ittihad El Shorta. He was relieved of his duties the following year, and joined New Radiant SC in the Maldives on 27 November 2013.

On 7 May 2014, García moved to Piast Gliwice. On 18 March 2015, he was dismissed by the Polish club.

Death
García died on 17 October 2019 – the day of his 62nd birthday – in Murcia, due to cancer.

References

External links

1957 births
2019 deaths
Footballers from Madrid
Spanish footballers
Association football defenders
La Liga players
Segunda División players
Segunda División B players
Real Madrid Castilla footballers
Real Madrid CF players
Real Murcia players
Elche CF players
Spain youth international footballers
Spain under-21 international footballers
Spanish football managers
Segunda División B managers
UD Almería B managers
Piast Gliwice managers
Nacional Potosí managers
Spanish expatriate football managers
Expatriate football managers in Egypt
Expatriate football managers in Poland
Expatriate football managers in Bolivia
Spanish expatriate sportspeople in Egypt
Spanish expatriate sportspeople in Poland
Spanish expatriate sportspeople in Bolivia